The Ministry for Internal Affairs of Komi Republic (Министерство внутренних дел по Республике Хакасия) is the main law enforcement organization in the Komi Republic in Russia. It is subordinate to the Russian Interior Ministry and the President of Komi Republic.

History
November 1917 - The Militsiya of Yaren and Ust-Sysol Was Established.
1921 - The Militsiya of Komi Republic was born, as Oblast Commissariat for Internal Affairs
1935 - The Traffic Police (Госавтоинспекция) was formed.
1948 - The Investigation Department was established.
1989 - Department against Organized Crime was established.
1991 - The Militsiya of Komi Republic was split into the Militsiya for Public Security (милиция общественной безопасности) and the Criminal Militsiya
1991 - The local OMON was formed.
1996 - The Service for Internal Security was born as part of the Internal Ministry (служба собственной безопасности МВД РК)

Ministers
Vladimir Yeryomchenko (2007 - 2011)
Vladimir Silaev (2005 - 2007)
Alexander Zadkov (2003 - 2005)
Vladimir Romanovich (1999 - 2003)
Evgeny Trofimov (1987 - 1999)
Vasily Grinin (1982 - 1987)
Vladimir Yusakov (1973 - 1982)
Vladimir Dubrovin (1966 - 1973)
Konstantin Bayutov (1965 - 1965)
Nikolay Knyazev (1961 - 1965)
 Nikolay Khailov (1953 - 1954)
Nikolai Noginov (1952 - март 1953)
Stepan Degtev (1946 - 1952)
Vasiliy Zezegov (1946)
Leonid Buyanov (1944 - 1946)
Savvatiy I. Kabakov (1941 - 1944)
Vasily Simakov (1941)
Savvatiy Kabakov (1940 - 1941)
Mikhail Zhuravlev (1939 - 1940)
Demyan Kovalev (1937 - 1939)
Fyodor A. Andreyev (1936 - 1937)
Phillipp S. Trubitsyn (1936 - 1937), Head of local NKVD
Ivan Vlasov (1935 - 1936)
Fyodor Andreyev (1934 - 1935)
Phillipp Trubitsyn (1933 - 1934)
Nikolay Pavlov (1932 - 1933)
Grigoriy Nikolaev (1930 - 1932)
Alexander Byzov (1927 - 1929)
Vasiliy I. Chuistov (1926 - 1927)
Pavel V. Zaboyev (1925 - 1926)
Yakov Krivoshchekov (1924 - 1925)
Pavel V. Zaboyev (1924)
Leonid Lipovsky (1923 - 1924)
Vasiliy Chuistov (1922 - 1923)
Alexander Mikhailov (1921 - 1922)

External links
Official Website
 Official YouTube Channel

Politics of the Komi Republic
Komi
Komi